To "bite the bullet" is to “accept the inevitable impending hardship and endure the resulting pain with fortitude”. The phrase was first recorded by Rudyard Kipling in his 1891 novel The Light that Failed. It has been suggested that it is derived historically from the practice of having a patient clench a bullet in their teeth as a way to cope with the pain of a surgical procedure without anesthetic, though evidence for biting a bullet rather than a leather strap during surgery is sparse, although Harriett Tubman related having once assisted in a Civil War amputation in which the patient was given a bullet to bite down on. It has been speculated to have evolved from the British expression "to bite the cartridge", which dates to the Indian Rebellion of 1857, but the phrase "chew a bullet", with a similar meaning, dates to at least 1796.

The phrase was used in a literal sense in the 1975 film Bite the Bullet. One of the characters has a broken, aching tooth and cannot get treatment. He uses a shell casing to cover the exposed nerve; the slug is removed from the bullet, the cap was hit to expend that charge, and the casing was cut down to allow it to sit level with his other teeth.

See also 
Reductio ad absurdum
Unintended consequence

References

Further reading

Philosophical phrases
Metaphors referring to objects
Metaphors referring to war and violence
Dilemmas
Anesthesia
American slang
1890s neologisms
Quotations from literature
Quotations from philosophy
Rudyard Kipling
Moral psychology